Kldiani is a village at an altitude of 380 meters from sea level in the Gagra District of Abkhazia, Georgia.

See also
 Gagra District

Notes

Literature 
 Georgian Soviet Encyclopedia, V. 5, p. 552, Tb., 1980.

References

Populated places in Gagra District